Sarnico is a comune (municipality) in the Province of Bergamo in the Italian region of Lombardy, about  northeast of Milan and about  east of Bergamo at the southern end of Lake Iseo.  

Sarnico borders the following municipalities: Adrara San Martino, Iseo, Paratico, Predore, Viadanica, and Villongo.

Twin towns — sister cities
Sarnico is twinned with:

  Plan-de-Cuques, France

References

External links
 Official website